Motor vehicle insurance law in India is governed by the Motor Vehicles Act, Insurance Act and aspects of insurance contracts governed by the Indian Contract Act, Transfer of Property Act and a few others. Motor vehicle insurance is the insurance coverage of the risk of third party arising out the use of motor vehicle and also for covering the risk of damage caused to the vehicle. Taking insurance policy for coverage of certain risks are made compulsory and coverage for other risks are optional at the instance of the owner. Accordingly, motor vehicle insurance policies can be divided into two, namely, compulsory insurance policy (Act policy) and comprehensive policy.

Act liability insurance
A motor vehicle in a public place is potentially a dangerous and lethal instrument. Even when it is without its engine or without petrol, if it is moved down on an incline, even unintentionally, it can cause considerable damage and human injury. Hence, unlike other properties which may be insured or not at the option of the owner, a motor vehicle is required by law to be insured in respect of the user's liability for death, bodily injury or damage to property of third party. These kinds of insurance contracts are based on indemnity and only cover the damage, and the whole insurance amount is not given every time.

As sometimes the driver of the vehicle is often a person of small means and injured person goes without adequate compensation, insurance of motor vehicle covering the third party risk is made compulsory in India and the Motor Vehicles Act provides that, vehicle should not be used in public place without having insurance policy covering third party risks. Third party risk means risk covered for bodily injury, death and damage of property of third party. Third party means any person except owner or passenger in the private vehicle. So pillion rider of the motor cycle, passengers in private cars, jeeps etc. are not third party. However, passengers in public vehicle such as bus, contract carriage vehicle, taxi etc. are also third party and hence covered by third party or statutory policy.

The occupants of private vehicles and pillion riders are not covered by the Act policy. However, they can be covered by paying additional premium of insurance. If additional premium is not paid to cover the risk of occupants of private vehicle and pillion rider, insurance company will not be liable to compensate such victims. However, Supreme court held that if the policy is package/comprehensive policy, then the occupants of private vehicles and pillion rider are covered, even if the additional premium of coverage of such person is not paid.

Motor vehicle insurer
With the emergence of insurance company booms in India there has been occurrence of bike insurance company as mushrooms. There are very few players which has been identified by the Insurance Regulatory and Development Authority of India.

See also
Vehicle insurance

References

External links
The Motor Vehicles Act 1988
Yashpal Luthra and Anr Vs United India Insurance Co. Hon'ble Delhi HC coverage of pillion rider &occupants in private car
Oriental Insurance Co Vs Surendranadh Loomba and others, Supreme court of India

Law of India
Insurance law
Vehicle insurance
General insurance in India